Koorathalvar (born as Kuresa) was the chief disciple of the prominent Vaishnavite saint Ramanuja. According to popular tradition, he was a humble man who assisted Ramanuja in all of his endeavours.

Early life 
Koorathalvar was born as Kuresan in a small hamlet 'Kooram' near Kanchi, in the year of 1010 A.D in an affluent family. He belonged to the clan of Haritha, who were popular landlords. Koorathalvar was married at a young age to Andal, a devout and pious lady. Both of them were recorded to have led a happy and peaceful life. They were deeply devoted to the deity Varadaraja Perumal. The couple were renowned in the holy town of Kanchipuram for their unstinting philanthropy and kindness. Their children were Parasara Bhattar and Veda Vyasa Bhattar.

Meeting Ramanuja 
Kuresan was heavily influenced by the teachings of Ramanuja, who was staying in Kanchipuram at that time. It was the period when Ramanuja's teachings were growing popular and his philosophy was slowly spreading. Kuresan quickly approached Ramanuja and became his disciple. A bond was established between them and under the effective guidance of Ramanuja, Kuresan was initiated into the rigorous study of Vedic scriptures and other canons.

Ramanuja moved to Srirangam and the friendship between Ramanauja and Koorathalvar came to a temporary end. Later, Koorathalvar continued his earlier philanthropic works.

Divine Plan 
According to popular tradition, Varadaraja Perumal and his consort Perundevi heard the heavy sound of a door being closed. Kuresan had closed the brass doors of his home, after completing his daily routine of feeding the poor. By the order of this deity, who appeared in the dream, the chief priest arrived at the door step of Kuresan to usher him towards the deity. On hearing this news, rather than feeling happy, Kuresan was extremely saddened, as he believed that it was a sin on his part to disturb the deity and his consort during the night by 'announcing' his charity activities. This incident stirred up a turmoil in the mind of Kuresan, which was a turning point in his life. At once, he and his wife decided to renounce all their belongings and move to Srirangam, where Ramanuja was staying. On reaching Srirangam, the couple were given a warm welcome and Ramanuja was very happy to meet his old friend again. Kuresan became a disciple of Ramanuja and assisted him in all his works such as spiritual study, management of the temple, philosophical compositions and many others. Soon, Koorathalvar became the most indispensable attendant of Ramanuja.

Journey to Kashmir 
One of the main aims of Ramanuja was to compose the Sri Bhasya. To compose this work, he wanted to refer Bodhayana's vritti (musings), an ancient work known as the Brahma Sutras. This work was available in the royal library of the state of Kashmir. Ramanujacharya and Koorathalvar, along with other disciples, undertook the tedious journey to Kashmir and met the king of that state. The king was very much pleased with these pious men and immediately granted them access to the library. But the pandits of the region were not pleased with the outsiders and troubled them incessantly. They put forth a condition that the 'vritti' shall not leave the library. So, Ramanuja and Koorathalvar acquiesced to read the 'vritti' within the premises of the library itself. To cause more trouble, the pandits went still further to place a condition that no notes must be taken while reading the vritti. Afterwards, Ramanuja decided to return to Srirangam and they started their journey back south. Ramanujachraya was disappointed for not making an adequate reading of the vritti. But after reaching Srirangam he realised that he had forgotten nothing. Koorathalvar had read the entire text of the vritti and had memorised it completely. He was able to recall the vritti, instantly and accurately word-for-word. With a great sense of fulfillment, Ramanuja completed the Sri Bashya, which was a commentary on the Brahmasutras.

Thus, the completion of the Sri Bashya was mainly because of the involvement of Koorathalvar. His works include Sri Vaikuntha Stavam, Athimanushastavam, Sundarabahustavam, Varadarajastavam and Sri Stavam. These five works were collectively known as Panchastavi.

Meeting the Chola King 
After a certain period of time, the glory of Sri Ramanujacharya spread far and wide. Since Ramanuja had provided citations from authorised scriptures to prove the supreme authority of Narayana (Vishnu), the contemporary Chola King - Rajaraja Anabaya Kulothunga Chola II (Second Kulothangan) also called as Thiruneetru Chola Boopathy or Krimikanta Chola - who was a devotee of Shaivism, was deeply offended. He had also executed several Vaishnavas for not converting to Shaivism in his realm.  The reason for his vengeance towards Vaishnavas was due to the Govindaraja Swamy idol present in Chidambaram.

The establishment of the deities Nataraja, Parvati, and Govindaraja dates back to Puranic times. According to religious tradition, Shiva and Parvati got into an argument regarding which of them dances better. Hence, they decided to select Vishnu (Govindaraja) as a judge to decide the superior one in a tournament. Shiva took the form of Nataraja, engaging in a celestial dance along with Parvati. They were believed to have transformed themselves into an idol and chosen to remain in Chidambaram.

The feet of Govindaraja reclining in the snake Adisesha were directed towards Lord Nataraja, which Kulothunga felt was an insult to his Shiva. At first, he made the footpath for devotees to visit the deity Govindaraja tougher to walk across. He later ordered the shrine to be closed indefinitely. An elderly woman who attempted to visit Govindaraja was severely beheaded in broad daylight by the zealous Kulothunga himself. At last, he discarded the idol out of the temple into the ocean, banishing all Vaishnava involvement in the temple.

Envious of Ramanuja, the monarch invited Ramanuja to his "Vidvatha Sadhas" to debate his philosophy. Realising that this was a threat, Koorathalvar immediately rushed back to the ashram in Srirangam and requested Ramanuja and the others to move away to a safer place. Though initially unwilling to do so, Ramanuja had to oblige to his adamant disciples. When the soldiers came to the ashram, Koorathalvar adorned the robes of his guru and presented himself to the soldiers as Ramanuja. Accompanied by Mahapurna (Periya Nambi), they reached the king's court. There, the Shaivite scholars debated them, but Koorathalvar (disguised as Ramanuja) and Mahapurna defeated them in the debate. One particular soldier who had seen Ramanuja before reported to the king about the disguise. The king was infuriated and at once ordered them to respect Shiva as the supreme deity and accept Shaivism, but Koorathalvar and Mahapurna refused, to which the king grew enraged and ordered their eyes to be pulled out. Koorathalvar at once pulled his eyes out and threw them at the king. The eyes of Mahapurna were also gorged by the soldiers and they were sent away from the court. Already 105 years old, Mahapurna passed away on the way back to Srirangam.

Records of temples and royal orders state that Kulothunga Chola II died painfully of throat cancer, and was mocked forever as Krimikanta Chola (Chola of the cancerous throat). The later Chola kings were supportive of both denominations, as stated by state records.

Ramanuja, meanwhile, had moved to Melkote in Karnataka along with his disciples and established Vaishnavism there with the support of the local king. After a turbulent period of over 12 years had lapsed, and after the death of the king who had banished him from Srirangam, Ramanuja decided to return to Srirangam and to leave Melkote forever. Upon hearing the news of the return of Ramanuja, Koorathalvar was joyous. Since he was blind, he used the help of his friends and disciples to meet Ramanuja in his ashram. Ramanuja suggested that he request for his lost eyes to Varadaraja of Kanchipuram. Koorathalvar did so, it is traditionally believed that God readily granted his eyes on the Kachi street of Kanchipuram. For this reason, Vedanta Desikan hailed Lord Varadarajan as "Kachi thanil kan kodukkum perumal" (The deity who is the bestower of eyes). Kuresan's vision was restored and saluted Ramanuja for all his glory. Koorathalvar lived for a few more years and later attained the "holy feet of the lord".

Thaniyan on Sri Ramanujacharya 
Koorathazhwan composed a thaniyan on Sri Ramanujacharya

 yO nityam achyuta pAdAmbuja yugma rukma
vyAmOhatastaditarANi tRuNAya mEnE |
asmad gurOr bhagavatO asya dayaikasindhOh
rAmAnujasya charaNou SaraNam prapadyE || 

yO - who
nityam - always
achyuta pAdAmbuja yukma rukma vyAmOhatah - because of his excessive desire for the lotus Feet of the Lord which he considered as wealth
tat itarANi - every thing else
tRuNAya mEnE - thought as mere nothing
asmat gurOh - our AchArya
bhagavatah - having all auspicious qualities
dayA Eka sindhOh - ocean of mercy alone
asya rAmAnujasya - to such Sri rAmAnuja
charaNou - to his venerable feet
SaraNam - i take them as means
prapadyE - i prostrate

I seek the Holy Feet of Sri Ramanujacharya who considered all the worldly things and pleasures as mere nothing, because of his love towards the Divine Feet of Achyuta. He is our guru since he possesses all the auspicious qualities and therefore the ocean of mercy.

References

1010 births
Year of death missing
Hindu philosophers and theologians
Sri Vaishnava religious leaders